The East Bay Children's Book Project is a non-profit group that assists literacy efforts by distributing books to children who do not have access to enough books. They have distributed more than 1,000,000 books since 2005. Books donated by the East Bay Children's Book Project have been used in schools, day-care centers, community centers, homeless shelters, and hospitals. The East Bay Children's Book Project is located in Oakland, California.

History 
The East Bay Children's Book Project opened in 2005 as a small non-profit group, hoping to give away 1000 books which had been culled from the libraries of a group of retired teachers. The organization grew so quickly that they are now giving away more than 100,000 books a year. In 2009, they became a 501(c)(3) non-profit group.

References

External links 
 East Bay Children's Book Project
 East Bay Concepts

2005 establishments in California
Educational charities based in the United States
Charities based in California